Sultana is a town in Jhunjhunu District of the Indian state of Rajasthan. It belongs to Jaipur Division. It is located 25 km to the east of District headquarters Jhunjhunu. 200 km from State capital Jaipur

Sultana Pin code is 333028 and postal head office is Sultana.

Kithana (4 km),kishorpura ( 2.5km) Ardawata (7 km), Bhukana (8 km), Nari (8 km), Silarpuri (8 km) are the nearby villages to Sultana. Sultana is surrounded by Jhunjhunun Tehsil to the west, Khetri Tehsil to the east, Chirawa Tehsil to the north.
Sultana is located in chirawa tehsil
The area is covered mainly Marwaris but its main castes are Ahirs,Rajputs, Jat and Muslims. Sultana is a town having population more than 40000. Many Banks, Hospitals, Power Station, Police Sub Station, Post Office, Tower( shree tower) Schools, Library (Shree international Library) in Sultana

People who hail from the village of Sultana, generally keep the surname Sultania. The Sultanias are now found all throughout India, but mainly in the industrial centres like New Delhi, Rewari, Narnaul, Gurugram, Mumbai, Jaipur, Bangalore, Hyderabad, Bihar, Jharkhand and Kolkata. Sultaniya mainly Gotra of Ahirs who found mostly in South Haryana specially in Rewari (Villages Saharanwas, Bohtwas Ahir, Kakoria, Bassduda, Bangrawa)

Travel

Sultana is not accessible directly by rail. The nearest railway stations is Chirawa (12 km) served by Northern Western Railway and lying on the Sikar-Loharu Broad Gauge section.

 Tourist Places Near By Sultana   sultana is the best agriculture .there are many Muslim people in sultana.
Jhunjhunu     Jai hindustan
Nawalgarh     
Mandawa

External links
 2001 census Jhunjhunu

Villages in Jhunjhunu district